A dunam (Ottoman Turkish,;), also known as a donum or dunum and as the old, Turkish, or Ottoman stremma, was the Ottoman unit of area equivalent to the Greek stremma or English acre, representing the amount of land that could be ploughed by a team of oxen in a day.

The unit is still in use in many areas previously ruled by the Ottomans, although the new or metric dunam has been redefined as exactly one decare, which is 1/10 hectare (1/10 × ), like the modern Greek royal stremma.

History
The name dönüm, from the Ottoman Turkish dönmek ("to turn"), appears to be a calque of the Byzantine Greek stremma and had the same size. It was likely adopted by the Ottomans from the Byzantines in Mysia-Bithynia.

Definition

Albania, Bosnia and Herzegovina, Serbia, Montenegro 
In Bosnia and Herzegovina and also Serbia, the unit is called dulum (дулум) or dunum (дунум). In Bosnia and Herzegovina dunum (or dulum) equals . In Albania it is called dynym or dylym.

Bulgaria
In Bulgaria, the decare (декар) is used.

Cyprus
In the Republic of Cyprus older Greek-Cypriots also still refer to the donum using the local Greek Cypriot dialect word σκάλες [skales], rather than the mainland Greek word stremma (equivalent to a decare). However, since 1986 officially Cyprus uses the square metre and the hectare.

Greece

In Greece, the old dönüm is called a "Turkish stremma", while today, a stremma or "royal stremma" is exactly one decare, like the metric dönüm.

Iraq

Levant and Turkey

United Arab Emirates 
The Dubai Statistics Center and Statistics Centre Abu Dhabi use the metric dunam (spelt as donum) for data relating to agricultural land use. One donum equals .

Variations
Other countries using a dunam of some size include Libya and Syria.

Conversions
A metric dunam is equal to:

 1,000 square metres (exactly)
 10 ares (exactly)
 1 decare (exactly)
 0.1 hectares (exactly)
 0.001 square kilometres (exactly)
 0.247105381 acres (approx)
 1,195.99005 square yards (approx)
 10,763.9104 square feet (approx)

Comparable measures

The Byzantine Greek stremma was the probable source of the Turkish unit. The zeugarion (Turkish çift) was a similar unit derived from the area plowed by a team of oxen in a day. The English acre was originally similar to both units in principle, although it developed separately.

See also
 Orders of magnitude (area) for further comparisons
 Conversion of units
 Feddan, a similar non-SI unit of area used in Egypt, Sudan, and Syria.
 Resm-i donum, a land tax based on the area of a farm.

References

External links
 Foreign Weights and Measures Formerly in Common Use
 Dictionary of units
 Variable donums in Turkey
 Summary based on UN handbook

Units of area
Turkish words and phrases
Metricated units